The Shiva temple, also known as Motishwar Mandir, is a temple complex located near the Al Alam Palace in the Muttrah area of Old Muscat, Oman. It is one of the oldest Hindu temples in the Middle East region. The temple celebrates numerous Hindu festivals such as Vasant Panchmi, Ramnavmi, Hanuman Jayanti, Shravan and Ganesh Chaturthi. Over 20,000 Hindus visit the temple during Maha Shivaratri.

History
The temple is believed to have been built 109–125 years ago by the Thatta's Bhatia (Sindh Pakistan ) aste merchant community in Oman. The Bhatia merchant community from Sindh Pakistan first settled in Muscat in 1507.|

Overview

The complex contains three temples - Shri Adi Motishwar Mahadev Temple, Shri Motishwar Mahadev Temple and Shri Hanumanji Temple.  Although Muscat is a desert, the temple's well has water throughout the year. There are three priests in the temple along with three support staff and four administrative staff, besides a whole gamut of volunteers rendering their services.

Indian Prime Minister Narendra Modi visited the temple on 12 February 2018, during his state visit to Oman, and performed an abhishekam and interacted with the members of the Temple Management Committee.

See also
BAPS Shri Swaminarayan Mandir Abu Dhabi
Shrinathji Temple, Bahrain
Hinduism in Oman

References

Buildings and structures in Muscat, Oman
Hindu temples in Oman
Temples in Oman